Nordvik Bay (Nordvik xomoto) is a gulf in the Laptev Sea in the north of Russia. Lat 73° 45' and long 112°. 

Nordvik Bay and most of its surrounding area belongs to the Sakha Republic administrative division of the Russian Federation.

Geography
It is located Southeast of the mouth of the Khatanga Gulf, between two small peninsulas. The landspit in the west is the Uryung Tumus Peninsula, where there was formerly a village called Nordvik and an infamous penal colony that lies now deserted. The peninsula in the east is called Nordvik Peninsula, with Cape Paksa at its northern end, and on its eastern side lies the Anabar Bay.

Nordvik Bay is 39 km wide and it has a regular semicircular shape. It is quite shallow, its average depth being around 6 m. It is circled by lowlands and, since the climate in the area is exceptionally severe, with prolonged, bitter winters, Nordvik Bay is covered by ice most of the year.

History
The name literally means "North Bay" in Norwegian. It was discovered and named by the Russian Great Northern Expedition in 1739.

During the 1930s this area experienced a limited boom owing to the first icebreaker convoys plying the Northern Sea Route. Tiksi Bay and Mys Schmidta had become airports and Nordvik was "a growing town."

See also
Arctic Ocean Hydrographic Expedition
Russian Hydrographic Service

References

External links
 The Siberian Sea Road: The Work of the Russian Hydrographical Expedition to the Arctic 1910-1915  
 Записки Харитона Лаптева (Exploration of the area)

Gulfs of Russia
Gulfs of the Laptev Sea
Bodies of water of the Sakha Republic
Geography of Gulag
North Siberian Lowland